Ekspress-AM1 (meaning Express-AM1) is a Russian domestic communications satellite. It belongs to the Russian Satellite Communications Company (RSCC) based in Moscow, Russia. To provide of communications services (digital television, telephony, videoconferencing, data transmission, the Internet access) and to deploy satellite networks by applying VSAT technology to Russia and its neighbors (CIS).

Satellite description 
The satellite has a total of 28 transponders, was 9 C-band, 18 Ku-band and 1 L-band transponders. The Ekspress-AM1 Russian domestic communications satellite, built by Information Satellite Systems Reshetnev (NPO PM)) for Kosmicheskaya Svyaz. The communications payload was built by the Japanese companies NEC and Toshiba.

Launch 
Ekspress-AM1 was launched by Khrunichev State Research and Production Space Center, using a Proton-K / DM-2M launch vehicle. The launch took place at 22:11:00 UTC on 29 October 2004, from Site 200/39 at Baikonur Cosmodrome, Kazakhstan. Successfully deployed into geostationary transfer orbit (GTO), Ekspress-AM1 raised itself into an operational geostationary orbit using its apogee motor.

Mission 
Ekspress-AM1 failed in May 2010 following a shutdown of its attitude-control system. It was recovered, but inclination increased afterwards. On 10 August 2013, the satellite was finally decommissioned and afterwards sent to a graveyard orbit.

References 

Ekspress satellites
Spacecraft launched in 2004
2004 in Russia
Satellites using the KAUR bus